The Southern Illinois Salukis men's basketball statistical leaders are individual statistical leaders of the Southern Illinois Salukis men's basketball program in various categories, including points, assists, blocks, rebounds, and steals. Within those areas, the lists identify single-game, single-season, and career leaders. The Salukis represent Southern Illinois University Carbondale in the NCAA's Missouri Valley Conference.

Southern Illinois began competing in intercollegiate basketball in 1913. However, the school's record book does not generally list records from before the 1950s, as records from before this period are often incomplete and inconsistent. Since scoring was much lower in this era, and teams played much fewer games during a typical season, it is likely that few or no players from this era would appear on these lists anyway.

The NCAA did not officially record assists as a stat until the 1983–84 season, and blocks and steals until the 1985–86 season, but Southern Illinois's record books includes players in these stats before these seasons. These lists are updated through the end of the 2020–21 season.

Scoring

Rebounds

Assists

Steals

Blocks

References

Lists of college basketball statistical leaders by team
Statistical